Under the Whyte notation for the classification of steam locomotives by wheel arrangement, the  is a Garratt articulated locomotive. The wheel arrangement is effectively two 4-8-4 locomotives operating back to back, with the boiler and cab suspended between the two engine units. Each engine unit has two pairs of leading wheels in a leading bogie, followed by four coupled pairs of driving wheels and two pairs of trailing wheels in a trailing bogie. Since the 4-8-4 type is sometimes known as a Northern, the corresponding Garratt type would be referred to as a Double Northern.

Overview
There were only two classes of 4-8-4+4-8-4 steam locomotives across the globe, all of which were constructed by Beyer, Peacock & Company, the owners of the Garratt patent.

The predecessor 4-8-2+2-8-4 Double Mountain was probably the optimal Garratt wheel arrangement, with the four-wheeled leading bogies and the two-wheeled trailing trucks on each engine unit ensuring stability at speed and with sixteen coupled wheels for traction. More coupled wheels would inhibit the locomotive on tight curves, while the only advantage of more non-coupled wheels, such as on the Double Northern, was to reduce the axle loading.

Use

Australia

The second Double Northern locomotive class were the AD60 class Garratts of the Australian  New South Wales Government Railways, of which 47 were delivered in 1952. Of these, 42 were delivered fully assembled while the last five were delivered in pieces as spare parts. The locomotive weighed 260 imperial tons and was the largest locomotive in the Southern Hemisphere. The last of the AD60 class entered service in 1956 and the last one was withdrawn from service in 1973.

Four of the New South Wales AD60 class have been preserved.
 No. 6029 has been restored and was named City of Canberra until late 2017. It was restored to running condition in 2015.
 Numbers 6039 and 6042 are owned by the Dorrigo Steam Railway & Museum.
 No. 6040 is stored on display at NSW Rail Museum, Thirlmere.

Kenya and Uganda
The first Double Northerns to be built were thirty class EC3 locomotives for the  Kenya Uganda Railway (KUR). The thirty locomotives of the class were constructed in three batches in 1939, 1940 and 1949. These engines later became classes 57 and 58 on the East African Railways (EAR).

One of the East African Railways locomotives survives, no. 87 Karamoja of 1940, EAR no. 5711. It is on display in the Nairobi Railway Museum in Kenya.

References

External links

8,4-8-4
88,4-8-4+4-8-4